Ulrich Peters (born 3 June 1951 in Schwerte, North Rhine-Westphalia) is a former West German slalom canoeist who competed in the 1960s and 1970s.

He won five medals at the ICF Canoe Slalom World Championships with a gold (K-1 team: 1975), a silver (K-1: 1975) and three bronzes (K-1: 1971; K-1 team: 1969, 1971).

Peters finished fourth in the K-1 event at the 1972 Summer Olympics in Munich. His niece, Violetta, won a bronze in the women's K-1 event at the 2008 Summer Olympics in Beijing representing Austria. His brother Wolfgang is also a former slalom canoeist.

References

External links

1951 births
Living people
People from Schwerte
Sportspeople from Arnsberg (region)
Canoeists at the 1972 Summer Olympics
German male canoeists
Olympic canoeists of West Germany
Medalists at the ICF Canoe Slalom World Championships